The Scorpion King is a 2002 American sword and sorcery action adventure film directed by Chuck Russell, starring Dwayne Johnson, Steven Brand, Kelly Hu, Grant Heslov and Michael Clarke Duncan. It is both a prequel and spin-off of The Mummy franchise and launched The Scorpion King film series. The film marks Johnson's first lead role. It received mixed reviews and grossed $180 million worldwide against the production budget of $60 million.

The events of The Scorpion King take place 5,000 years before the events of The Mummy and The Mummy Returns, revealing the origins of Mathayus and his rise to power as the legendary hero, the Scorpion King. The name is a reference to a historical king of the Protodynastic Period of Egypt, King Scorpion.

Plot 

Before the time of the pyramids, a horde of warriors from the East, led by Memnon, invades and conquers the local tribes, only a few of which survive. Mathayus, his half-brother Jesup, and their friend Rama, the only three true remaining Akkadians, are hired by King Pheron of the free tribes to kill Memnon's sorcerer for twenty blood rubies. The Akkadians sneak into Memnon's camp only to grapple with the guards due to having been warned by King Pheron's son, Takmet having pledged his allegiance to Memnon and killed his father as proof of his betrayal, leaving Rama killed by an arrow shot and Jesup executed. Mathayus, in the middle of this, finds Memnon's sorcerer, Cassandra, who predicts battle outcomes for Memnon and has been his prisoner since she was a child. At the end of the conflict, Memnon buries Mathayus in the desert to be devoured by fire ants at dawn. Mathayus escapes with help from a horse thief, Arpid, and desires to finish his mission and avenge his brother.

Mathayus sneaks into Memnon's stronghold, Gomorrah, and enters Memnon's palace with help from a street urchin. Memnon's sympathetic court magician, Philos, directs Mathayus to the courtyard where Memnon is training. Mathayus tries to shoot Memnon from the watchtower, but instead saves the street urchin from having his hand cut off by Takmet under suspicion of theft and barely escapes Gomorrah, abducting Cassandra along the way. Memnon sends his right-hand man, Thorak, and a group of guards to kill Mathayus and retrieve Cassandra. Mathayus slays them all under the cover of a sandstorm and in a cave, helped by Cassandra saving Mathayus from a poisonous arrow shot via her magic.

Mathayus, Arpid, and Cassandra run into Philos, who escaped Gomorrah and has perfected an explosive powder. However, they are ambushed by the rebels, now under the rule of the Nubian King Balthazar. Though Mathayus defeats Balthazar in a fight and earns his grudging respect and sanctuary, Cassandra informs Mathayus that she has a vision of Memnon and his army slaughtering the entire rebel camp. Furthermore, she explains that if Mathayus faces Memnon, he will likely die.

The next morning, Cassandra returns to Memnon in order to stall and possibly kill him. Mathayus, with help from Balthazar, Arpid, Philos, and the army of rebels, launches an all-out assault on Memnon's stronghold, facing Memnon personally before he can kill Cassandra. Balthazar takes on the full force of Memnon's forces alone and kills Takmet during the battle, thus, avenging King Pheron. The battle continues until Mathayus is shot by a guard, as predicted by Cassandra. As Memnon is about to claim victory, Cassandra kills the guard while Mathayus retrieves his bow and shoots an arrow at the exhausted Memnon, sending him off the edge of the roof and into a set of flames where he dies. Philos and Arpid use the explosive powder to destroy the palace's foundation stone, bringing down Memnon's forces. With the battle over, the remnants of Memnon's army bow before Mathayus, who by their law is proclaimed the Scorpion King.

In the aftermath, Mathayus and Balthazar share a good-natured farewell as the latter returns to his own kingdom. Cassandra tells Mathayus that she sees a period of peace and prosperity coming, but warns him that it will not last forever. Undeterred, Mathayus decides that they will make their own destiny.

Cast
 Dwayne Johnson as Mathayus of Akkad / The Scorpion King
 Steven Brand as Memnon
 Kelly Hu as Cassandra / Sorceress
 Grant Heslov as Arpid
 Bernard Hill as Philos
 Michael Clarke Duncan as Balthazar
 Peter Facinelli as Takmet
 Ralf Moeller as Thorak
 Branscombe Richmond as Jesup
 Roger Rees as King Pheron
 Sherri Howard as Queen Isis
 Conrad Roberts as Chieftain
 Joseph Ruskin as Tribal Leader

Soundtrack 

The soundtrack to The Scorpion King was released on 26 March 2002, just before the film was released on 19 April. It is filled with various bands performing either previous released tracks or their B-sides. The album has been certified Gold by the RIAA.

Weekly charts

Year-end charts

Certifications

Release

Home media
The Scorpion King was released on DVD and VHS on October 1, 2002. The Scorpion King was later released on Blu-ray on 22 July 2008, which was one of the first Universal titles released on that format. The Scorpion King was released on 4K on 18 June 2019.

Video games
The film spawned two video games: The Scorpion King: Rise of the Akkadian for the Nintendo GameCube and the PlayStation 2 which served as a prequel to the film's events; and a sequel, The Scorpion King: Sword of Osiris, for the Game Boy Advance, in which Cassandra is abducted by the ruthless sorcerer Menthu and his lackey, the witch Isis (not to be confused with Queen Isis from the film), prompting Mathayus to undergo a quest to uncover the legendary Sword of Osiris and use it to defeat Menthu and Isis once and for all and rescue Cassandra.

Reception

Box office
The Scorpion King grossed $12,553,380 on its opening day and $36,075,875 in total over the weekend, from 3,444 theaters for an average of $10,475 per venue, and ranking at #1 at the box office. The film had the largest April opening weekend, beating The Matrix. It then dropped 50 percent in its second weekend, but remained at #1, earning another $18,038,270. The film closed on 27 June 2002, with a total domestic gross of $91,047,077, and an additional $87,752,231 internationally, for a total worldwide gross of $178,799,308, against a budget of $60 million, making it a moderate box office success.

Critical response

The Scorpion King holds a 41% approval rating on Rotten Tomatoes, based on 137 reviews, with an average rating of 4.9/10. The sites' critical consensus states, "Action adventure doesn't get much cheesier than The Scorpion King." Metacritic gave the film a weighted average score of 45 out of 100, based on 30 reviews. Audiences polled by CinemaScore gave the film an average grade of "B", on a scale from A+ to F.

Roger Ebert, film critic of the Chicago Sun-Times, gave the film 3 out of 4 stars, writing "Here is a movie that embraces its goofiness like a Get Out of Jail Free card. The plot is recycled out of previous recycling jobs, the special effects are bad enough that you can grin at them, and the dialogue sounds like the pre-Pyramidal desert warriors are channeling a Fox sitcom... For its target audience, looking for a few laughs, martial arts and stuff that blows up real good, it will be exactly what they expected. It has high energy, the action never stops, the dialogue knows it's funny, and The Rock has the authority to play the role and the fortitude to keep a straight face. I expect him to become a durable action star."
James Berardinelli of ReelViews gave the film two stars (out of four), saying: "It's possible to make an engaging action/adventure picture of this sort, but The Scorpion King isn't it."
Dennis Harvey of Variety gave a positive review, saying the film "rouses excitement mostly from stuntwork and their agility rather than CGI excess." Nathan Rabin of The Onion's A.V. Club gave the film a mildly positive review, calling it "prototypical summer-movie fare, designed to be consumed, enjoyed, and forgotten all at once."
Owen Gleiberman of Entertainment Weekly gave the film a score of C+, calling it "plodding and obvious" but adding that The Rock "holds it together."
Jonathan Foreman of the New York Post gave a negative review, saying that The Scorpion King "has none of the qualities—epic sweep, relative originality and heartfelt bloodthirstiness—that made Conan so trashily entertaining."

Accolades
The film was nominated for Best Fantasy Film at the Saturn Awards but lost to The Lord of the Rings: The Two Towers.

Legacy

Prequel and sequels
Following the film's release, there were initial plans for a sequel with Johnson to return as Mathayus and go up against a new villain, Sargon, but these plans eventually fell through and the project was shelved. A direct-to-video prequel, The Scorpion King 2: Rise of a Warrior, was released in 2008 with Michael Copon as Mathayus and Randy Couture as Sargon.

A sequel, The Scorpion King 3: Battle for Redemption, was released in 2012 with Victor Webster as Mathayus and Billy Zane as the villain, King Talus.
The fourth film in the franchise, The Scorpion King 4: Quest for Power, was released in 2015. Webster reprised his role, while Michael Biehn, Rutger Hauer, Lou Ferrigno and former WWE wrestler Eve Torres joined the cast. Will Kemp portrayed the villain of the film, Drazen.

A fifth and final film, Scorpion King: Book of Souls, was in 2018. Zach McGowan played Mathayus, while Peter Mensah portrayed a villain of the film, Nebserek.

Reboot
In November 2020, a remake of The Scorpion King film series was announced to be in development. Jonathan Herman will serve as screenwriter, with the plot taking place in modern-day and involving a contemporary adaptation of Mathayus of Akkad / Scorpion King. Dwayne Johnson will serve as producer alongside Dany Garcia and Hiram Garcia. The project will be a joint-venture production between Universal Pictures and Seven Bucks Productions.

References

External links

 
 

2002 films
2002 action films
2000s fantasy adventure films
Ancient Mesopotamia in popular culture
American historical action films
American action adventure films
American adventure thriller films
American fantasy adventure films
Belgian fantasy films
English-language Belgian films
Films scored by John Debney
American films about revenge
Films directed by Chuck Russell
Films produced by James Jacks
Films produced by Sean Daniel
Films produced by Stephen Sommers
Films set in ancient Egypt
Films set in Iraq
Films shot in California
German action adventure films
English-language German films
The Mummy (franchise)
The Scorpion King (film series)
Interquel films
Film spin-offs
Films with screenplays by David Hayter
Films with screenplays by Stephen Sommers
American swashbuckler films
American sword and sorcery films
Universal Pictures films
WWE Studios films
2000s English-language films
2000s American films
2000s German films